The Kootenay International Junior Hockey League (KIJHL) is a Junior "B" Ice Hockey league in British Columbia, Canada sanctioned by Hockey Canada.  The winner of the Teck Cup competes with the champions of the Pacific Junior Hockey League (PJHL) and the Vancouver Island Junior Hockey League (VIJHL) for the Cyclone Taylor Cup, the British Columbia Provincial Title.  The winner of the Cyclone Taylor Cup moves on to compete for the Western Canada "B" Crown, the Keystone Cup.

History

Early history: 1966–1980

The Kootenay International Junior Hockey League was founded in 1966 as the West Kootenay Junior Hockey League. Five teams joined the league in its first year and started play in the 1969-70 season. They included the Trail Jr. Smoke Eaters, the Nelson Plaza Oilers, the Castlegar Apollos, the Grand Forks Border Bruins, and the Rossland Warriors. The Smoke Eaters won the inaugural league championship, advancing to the provincial championship. The next year, Castlegar would withdraw from the league, leaving only four teams. In 1971-1972, the Spokane Valley Kings and Cranbrook Colts joined the league, raising the number of teams to six, and incorporating an American team for the first time. Furthermore, the Nelson Plaza Oilers were renamed the Nelson Leafs. For 1972–73, the league was rebranded the Kootenay International Junior Hockey League. In this season, the Kimberley Knights joined the league, while the Grand Forks Border Bruins took a leave of absence. In 1973–74 the league expanded again, incorporating a Fernie-based team. The league did not expand for two  years after this point, during a period dominated by the Colts. The next expansion occurred in 1976–77, when the Creston Clippers and the Castlegar Rebels joined the league, and the Rebels won the league championship in their debut season. Columbia Valley joined in 1978–79 season, thus bringing the league to a total of 10 teams, an all-time high.

1980–1990

In the 1981–82 season, Fernie would withdraw from the league, while the Elk Valley Raiders (Sparwood) would join in their place. The following year, the Beaver Valley Nitehawks would join, bringing the league to a total of 12 teams. Creston would withdraw from the league in 1985, and Nelson, Elk Valley and Grand Forks would do the same in 1986. Elk Valley and Grand Forks would return the next year and Nelson in 1989. The 1980s were largely dominated by the Cranbrook Colts with a 6 championship winning streak.

1990–2000

In 1990, the Rocky Mountain Junior Hockey League was formed, creating a level of competition between the two geographic rival leagues. Cranbrook and Kimberley would depart the league in 1991, while the Golden Rockets would enter. The Rossland Warriors would return to the league the following season after a lengthy absence. In 1993–94, the KIJHL gained two new teams in the form of the North Okanagan Kings and the Revelstoke Grizzlies. North Okanagan won the league title in their first year. The following year, Elk Valley and Nelson would depart the league, while the Sicamous Eagles would join. The Eagles, too, won the league in their debut season. In 1996–97, the Castlegar Rebels relocated to Osoyoos, who played one season under the Rebels name, before being renamed the Heat. Castlegar was granted an expansion franchise in 1998–99, who was named the Rebels. In 1999–2000, the Nelson Leafs rejoined the KIJHL, winning the title in their first season back, and the Rossland Warriors relocated for a single season to Summerland. The 1999–2000 Summerland Warriors had the distinction of never having won a game, finishing their only season with a record of 0-45-0, conceding 485 goals in 45 games.

2000–2010

The 2000–01 season saw the folding of the Summerland Warriors and the creation of the Creston Valley Thunder Cats. In 2001–02, the league was split from two to three divisions, the Neil Murdoch, Eddie Mountain, and Okanagan/Shushwap. Along with the division re-alignment, the North Okanagan Kings relocated to Enderby, becoming the Enderby Ice Kings. The Osoyoos Heat took on the name the Osoyoos Storm, and an expansion franchise was granted to Summerland, which took the name Summerland Sting. 2001–02 also saw the presence of the KIJHL's most accomplished alumnus, Shea Weber, who played for the league champions Sicamous Eagles for this single season. In 2002–03, the Princeton Posse joined the league, becoming the furthest west team in the KIJHL, and the Enderby Ice Kings folded after one season. In 2004–05, the Fernie Ghostriders joined the league from the North American Hockey League, and the following year the Golden Rockets were renamed the Golden Xtreme. They were renamed again the following year, this time becoming the Golden Jets. Also, 2006–07 saw the demise of the Osoyoos Storm, who moved to Kamloops Storm, while retaining the Storm name. In 2007–08, the league was divided into two conferences, which were furthermore split into two divisions each, dropping the Okanagan Shushwap, while creating the Eddie Mountain Conference, East and West Divisions, and likewise with the Neil Murdoch Conference. The Golden Xtreme was again renamed, this time reverting to the Rockets name. Furthermore, the Chase Chiefs joined the league in 2007–08, while the Fernie Ghostriders would capture the league title. There were no team changes in 2008–09, and the Nelson Leafs would capture the league title. In 2009–10, however, the Summerland Sting were forced to relocate to nearby Penticton, taking the name Penticton Lakers. Furthermore, an expansion team was granted to Armstrong, and the North Okanagan Knights were founded.

2010–present

In the 2010–11 season, the Osoyoos Coyotes were formed, and won the league title in their debut season, while the Chase Chiefs relocated to Rutland, Kelowna to become the Kelowna Chiefs. The following year, two expansion franchises were granted to Chase and Summerland, and the Chase Heat and Summerland Steam were formed. The 2012–13 season saw no team changes, while the Castlegar Rebels won the league title. The following year, 2013–14, the Penticton Lakers were forced into relocation to 100 Mile House due to low ticket sales, which stemmed from playing in the neighbouring arena to that of the Jr. A Penticton Vees, whose national success offered difficult competition. The new team was branded the 100 Mile House Wranglers. The following year again saw no team changes, and the Kimberley Dynamiters won the league title. In 2015–16, the Grand Forks Border Bruins made the playoffs for the first time in 19 years, a provincial Jr. B record and the 100 Mile House Wranglers won the Keystone Cup; the Cyclone Taylor Cup and the KIJHL Championship in their third only season against the previous year's champion, the Dynamiters. The 2016-17 season marks the KIJHL's 50th anniversary, with the Creston Valley Thunder Cats hosting the Cyclone Taylor Cup. Prior to the 2019-20 KIJHL season, the Okanagan Division was renamed the Bill Ohlhausen Division along with the KIJHL Championship renamed the Teck Cup for sponsorship reasons. The Teck Cup not awarded due to the coronavirus pandemic and Jeff Dubois was later named the new commissioner.

Teams

Teck Cup Champions

NHL alumni

See also
List of ice hockey teams in British Columbia

External links
Official Website of the KIJHL

 
Ice hockey leagues in British Columbia
B
Junior ice hockey leagues in the United States
Sports leagues established in 1966
1966 establishments in British Columbia